Cryptostomaria is a genus of bryozoans belonging to the family Cellariidae.

The species of this genus are found in Oceania.

Species:

Cryptostomaria alata 
Cryptostomaria crassatina 
Cryptostomaria cylindrica

References

Bryozoan genera